The Cap Cana Championship was a golf tournament on the Champions Tour. It was played from 2008 to 2010 at the Punta Espada Golf Club in Cap Cana, Dominican Republic.

The purse for the 2010 tournament was $1,600,000, with $240,000 going to the winner.

Winners
2010 Fred Couples
2009 Keith Fergus
2008 Mark Wiebe

Source:

References

External links
Coverage on Champions Tour official site

Former PGA Tour Champions events
Golf tournaments in the Dominican Republic
Recurring sporting events established in 2008
Recurring sporting events disestablished in 2010
2008 establishments in the Dominican Republic
2010 disestablishments in the Dominican Republic